Nigel Gardner (16 February 1933 – 17 September 2016) was a British alpine skier. He competed in two events at the 1956 Winter Olympics.

References

External links
 

1933 births
2016 deaths
British male alpine skiers
Olympic alpine skiers of Great Britain
Alpine skiers at the 1956 Winter Olympics
Place of birth missing